Blue Ventures is a science-led social enterprise that develops transformative approaches for nurturing and sustaining locally led marine conservation. The organisation works in partnership with coastal communities in places where the ocean is vital to the culture and economy.

Blue Ventures' range of marine management models are designed to address the barriers between communities and conservation. By integrating community-led resource management with community health and alternative livelihood initiatives to benefit both people and nature.

Blue Ventures works in the Indian Ocean, southeast Asia and the Caribbean. They operate field programmes in Madagascar, Belize, and Timor-Leste with a small number of staff based in Comoros, Kenya, Mozambique and Tanzania supporting partners' projects.

Organisation 
Blue Ventures is structured as a social enterprise, comprising limited company Blue Ventures Expeditions Ltd (BVE) and registered charity Blue Ventures Conservation (BVC). The ecotourism expeditions operate through BVE to raise money and awareness for their conservation work through international paying volunteers who travel to project sites to assist with research and community projects. BVC, registered with the Charity Commission for England and Wales (charity number 1098893), conducts its own fundraising.

Blue Ventures' marine ecotourism operations also provide an effective platform on which the organisation can develop and test new models for conservation.

Blue Ventures is managed by a 30-person international team, with offices based in London and Bristol, responsible for the overall leadership of the organisation and supporting much larger field teams based within overseas country programmes. In 2017 Blue Ventures employed approximately 200 staff globally. The UK-based international team is supported by a board of trustees and nine advisors who assist staff in furthering the organisation's mission.

History and philosophy 
Blue Ventures was co-founded by Alasdair Harris, Matthew Linnecar, Dr. Robert Conway and Tom Savage in 2003. Blue Ventures aims to place the management of fisheries and marine resources in the hands of local communities, particularly in low-income countries where the national capacity for enforcement of marine and fisheries legislation is often weak. Their ethos is based on evidence that management of natural resources is more sustainable when entrusted to those people who depend on it most

Blue Ventures' strategy focuses on empowering coastal communities to manage their own resources and developing effective, adaptive and locally appropriate conservation strategies. The organisation advocates for fundamental human rights of small-scale fishers and works on promoting a human rights-based approach to fisheries management, designed to sustain local small-scale fisheries and safeguard marine biodiversity.

Through its field sites in Madagascar, Belize and Timor-Leste, and in collaboration with partner organisations in East Africa, Blue Ventures is developing and implementing models across four main programme areas: fisheries, mangroves (blue forests), aquaculture and community health.

Programmes

Rebuilding fisheries 
In 2004, Blue Ventures supported the village of Andavadoaka in southwest Madagascar to pilot a temporary octopus no-take zone (NTZ) near the island of Nosy Hao. The temporary octopus fishery closure was found to increase catches and boost fishers' incomes. The results prompting neighbouring villages up and down the coast to replicate this community-based approach to fisheries management.  The village of Andavadoaka was awarded the United Nations Equator Prize as a result of its efforts to promote sustainable marine resource management. In 2015 a paper analysing the positive catch and economic benefits of periodic octopus fishery closures was published by Thomas A Oliver and colleagues. It revealed significant positive impacts over 36 periodic closures in eight years.

Out of these replication efforts came the need for coordination of these closures among the neighbouring villages, and for a combined set of rules and regulations for fishing, outside of octopus gleaning. To fill this need, the communities worked with Blue Ventures and the Wildlife Conservation Society (WCS) to set up the Velondriake Locally Managed Marine Area (LMMA), administered by the Velondriake Association.  This protected area, which unites over 8,000 people from 24 villages in the management of almost 1,000 km of marine and coastal environment, is amongst the largest community-managed marine protected area in the Indian Ocean. In 2014 Blue Ventures worked with communities in northwest Madagascar to support the establishment of the Western Indian Oceans' largest LMMA in the Barren Isles.

By 2017, 28 communities in southwest Madagascar were implementing temporary octopus fisheries closures.

Blue ventures now supports a network of nearly 100 community data collectors in Madagascar, who are local fishers trained to collect important data from daily fish landings in their villages. The results of these monitoring efforts are used to help communities design and adapt resource management measures.

Learning Networks 
In 2012, Madagascar's first national LMMA forum was hosted by Blue Ventures and the Velondriake Association in Andavadoaka. This brought together 55 community members from 18 LMMAs representing 134 villages throughout Madagascar. The meeting resulted in the creation of a national LMMA network called MIHARI, an acronym for MItantana HArena and Ranomasina avy eny Ifotony, that translates to "Marine resources management at the local level". Blue Ventures is working with network members to support and develop the MIHARI network by providing training and educational tools. MIHARI now represents 196 LMMA associations, together protecting an area covering 17.7% of Madagascar's seabed (17,125 km).

Blue Forests 
Mangroves are one of the world's principal stores of "blue carbon", a term given to carbon accumulated in coastal or marine ecosystems. Madagascar is home to nearly 4,000 km of mangrove forests, the fourth largest extent found in Africa.

Blue Ventures' blue forests programme, established in 2011, links the conservation of mangroves, seagrass and coastal wetland habitats with international carbon markets, sustainable fisheries, and other incentives to catalyse community support for mangrove protection.

The blue forests programme is designed to incentivise community-based conservation of mangrove ecosystems in western Madagascar. Blue Ventures is working to generate carbon offsets through programmes such as REDD+, supporting the conservation and restoration of mangrove forests and promoting sustainable management of mangroves, while contributing to poverty alleviation. The blue forests project is using cutting-edge scientific research to examine deforestation and carbon sequestration in mangroves, while also finding engaging ways to raise awareness in local communities about the importance of mangrove forests.

In 2017, blue forests staff worked towards the transfer of management rights of more than 4,500 hectares of mangroves to communities from regional government departments. This is a key step in enabling local community members to monitor and enforce good practices in the mangrove forests on which they depend.

Aquaculture 

Blue Ventures' aquaculture programme supports communities to diversify their livelihoods by developing profitable sea cucumber and seaweed farms as a way of reducing fishing pressure and alleviating poverty. Since their community-based aquaculture programmes were first established, more than 700 people have been trained to farm sea cucumbers and seaweed. Over half of these are women, for whom alternative income sources are limited.

Blue Ventures develops models for community-based aquaculture in which farms are owned and operated by community members. The organisation's aquaculture teams provide materials and technical guidance, and assist the farmers with start-up costs.

Blue Ventures also facilitates small business development with training programmes that build the technical, financial and organisational skills needed by fishers to manage their aquaculture businesses for the long term.

Community health 

Isolated coastal communities face a range of interlinked social and environmental challenges. Just as a lack of transport infrastructure can prevent access to seafood markets, it can also prevent community members accessing essential health and family planning services. To improve access, Blue Ventures has established a community health programme, known locally as Safidy, which means "choice" in Malagasy. The organisation has integrated this with their marine conservation and livelihood initiatives.

Safidy contributes to Blue Ventures' holistic PHE approach to conservation and development, which aims to generate long-lasting positive economic, social and ecological change through understanding the connections between People, their Health and the Environment. PHE entails the integration of family planning and other community health services with natural resource management, biodiversity conservation and alternative livelihood initiatives

In 2017, in partnership with Madagascar's Ministry of Health and other private health organisations like USAID, Mikolo and Mahefa Miaraka, Blue Ventures' community health team collaborated in training and supporting community health workers across three regions in Madagascar (Atsimo Andrefana, Menabe, and Melaky) in order to provide family planning, maternal and child health, and water, sanitation and hygiene (WASH) health services. This will expand into the Ambanja region in the northwest of Madagascar.

Eco-tourism 
Blue Ventures runs volunteer expeditions to Madagascar, Belize and Timor-Leste, for international volunteers and for school and university groups. The volunteer programmes are integrated within every part of Blue Ventures' work. Its volunteer programme has received numerous awards within the tourism sector, and been praised by Simon Reeve of the BBC's Indian Ocean Series.

A central component of Blue Ventures' tourism activities at all three expedition sites is the community homestay, which offers a way for coastal communities to diversify and strengthen livelihoods other than fishing, ensuring the economic benefits of tourism go directly to local families, rather than resorts or international investors.

Field Sites

Madagascar 
Blue Ventures was founded in southwest Madagascar in 2003, and historically the majority of its operations have been focused along the south, west and northwest coasts of the island. Its national headquarters is located in the capital Antananarivo, and there are five regional offices (in Ambanja, Andavadoaka, Belo-sur-Mer, Maintirano and Toliara) linked to the organisation's programme sites. Blue Ventures' longest running marine expeditions programme is based in Andavadoaka in the southwest.

Blue Ventures is working towards a future where Madagascar's coastal zone is managed effectively by local fishing communities with the support of the government and other actors, thereby providing resilient livelihoods and food security for coastal people, while improving both human and ecosystem health. It works towards this goal by engaging communities at priority conservation sites in the development of integrated solutions to local challenges and incentive-based models. Having identified which approaches can be replicated beyond its field sites, Blue Ventures then collaborates with its conservation and development partners both nationally and internationally to facilitate the wider uptake of these models and develop learning networks that can sustain them.

Belize Programme
Since March 2010, the organisation has been running volunteer expeditions to Belize to conduct scientific research and educational outreach programmes.  The volunteer programme in Belize is located on the Belize Barrier Reef, which is a UNESCO World Heritage Site.

The organisation conducts ecological monitoring within the Bacalar Chico Marine Reserve in order to advise the Belize Fisheries Department on management effectiveness. 
Much of the work in Belize is focused on tackling the invasive red lionfish (Pterois volitans) population, including creating a market to drive the targeted removal of the lionfish, developing alternative sources of income such as lionfish fin jewellery and ecotourism trips to survey and hunt lionfish. Focusing on the economic interests of local fishers has led to much more ambitious fisheries management and in 2017 Blue Ventures led the development of a national lionfish management plan in collaboration with the Belize Government.

It also carries out community education, alternative livelihood development and outreach activities in Sarteneja, Corozal District, the largest fishing village in Belize. These include fishery-based management, a successful collaboration with the Sarteneja Homestay Group and supporting Belioness Lionfish Jewelry

Timor-Leste 
Blue Ventures' newest expedition site (established 2016) is located on Ataúro island in Timor-Leste, within the Coral Triangle. Covering less than 2% of the earth's oceans, the Coral Triangle hosts more than 75% of all known coral species, almost 40% of all known coral-reef fish species, and more than 50% of the world's coral reefs. Recent research indicates that Ataúro's reefs may harbour the world's greatest average fish diversity

The organisation is working with communities to diversify livelihoods to relieve pressure on declining fisheries, and to manage local marine resources through implementation of local customary laws known as tara bandu.

Blue Ventures is also collaborating with communities in mapping the relatively unexplored marine biodiversity of Ataúro. The organisation has trained eighteen community members in seagrass monitoring, eight of whom have started mapping Ataúro's seagrass meadows, a vital habitat for threatened dugongs. The community of Ilik-Namu has requested support from Blue Ventures to establish a new LMMA and community consultations are underway to develop plans for the protected area, which will be protected under Timorese customary law, tara bandu.

Eight homestay families in the local community of Beloi now host volunteers for up to three weeks for every Blue Ventures expedition, and there are plans to expand the homestay programme with other interested communities on the island. Homestays provide a reliable income stream for host families and this helps to reduce reliance on fishing as the communities primary source of income.

Awards

Blue Ventures has won a number of awards including;
WWF Duke of Edinburgh Conservation Award, 2015
Global Youth Travel Award for Outstanding Volunteer Project, 2015
Skoll Award for Social Entrepreneurship, 2015
The St Andrews Prize for the Environment, 2014
Excellence in Leadership for Family Planning (EXCELL) Award 2013.
Tusk Conservation Awards - Highly Commended prize 2013.
SeaWeb Seafood Champion Award 2012 for seafood sustainability.
The British Youth Travel Awards 2012. Winner in "Best Volunteering Organisation" category.
The Buckminster Fuller Challenge award in 2011 Buckminster Fuller Challenge, 2011 - "For developing a comprehensive, integrated, solution that has significant potential to solve one of humanity's most pressing problems."
Responsible Tourism Awards 2010. Winner in the "Best Volunteering Organisation" category.
Condé Nast Traveler Environmental Award 2009.
Equator Prize 2007.
Skål International Eco-tourism Awards 2006. Winner of the "General Countryside" category.
United Nations SEED Award (UNDP, UNEP, IUCN) 2005.

References

External links 
 Blue Ventures Website
 Velondriake Website
 MIHARI Website

Fisheries conservation organizations
Marine conservation organizations
Nature conservation organisations based in the United Kingdom
Environmental organisations based in London
Organizations established in 2003
Population concern advocacy groups
Population concern organizations